Régis Jolivet (8 November 1891, Lyon – 4 August 1966, Lyon) was a French philosopher and Roman Catholic priest. In 1932, he founded the school of philosophy at the Catholic University of Lyon, and was made a knight (Chevalier) of the Legion of Honour in 1961.

References

External links
Regis Jolivet Introduction a Kierkegaard 1946 French and English 1948 German
Regis Jovilet The God of Reason 1958
Regis Jolivet Men And Metaphysics (1961)
Regis Jolivet Sartre the Theology of the Absurd 1965 French Edition

1891 births
1966 deaths
20th-century French philosophers
Chevaliers of the Légion d'honneur
French male non-fiction writers
Academic staff of the Catholic University of Lyon
20th-century French Roman Catholic priests
20th-century French male writers